Street fighting is hand-to-hand combat in public places, between individuals or groups of people. The venue is usually a public place (e.g. a street) and the fight sometimes results in  serious injury or occasionally even death.<ref>White, Rob. et al (2007). 'Youth Gangs, Violence and Anti-Social Behaviour. Australian Research and Alliance Club. pp. 18, 29.</ref> Some street fights can be gang-related.

A typical situation might involve two men arguing in a bar, then one suggests stepping outside, where the fight commences. Thus, it is often possible to avoid the fight by backing off, while in self-defense, a person is actively trying to escape the situation, using force if necessary to ensure their own safety.

In some martial arts communities, street fighting and self-defense are often considered synonymous.



 History 
Evidence for human fighting goes back 430,000 years ago in Spain, where a fossil skull was found with two fractures apparently caused by the same object, implying an intentional lethal attack. Another record of early human fighting is one that happened 9500 to 10,500 years ago in Nataruk, Kenya. The hunter-gatherers fight was a group fight involving both males and females as well as children. They were armed with bladelets and arrow projectiles. The fight was to protect their valuables such as lands, food and water resources and their tribes or families or to respond mortally to the threat from the encounter between two groups of people.

 Characteristic 

Street fights can be planned ahead or occur suddenly, regardless of location and time. The frequency of physical assaults is based on crime rates, level of poverty and accessibility to weapons. In street fights, everyone can be opponents, including friends, relatives or even strangers. Street fights are usually started with an outbreak of emotion such as anger, fear and indignation. Street fights do not last long, usually run for minutes or even seconds. The outcome of the fight is unpredictable due to the fact that participants are unlikely to know others’ abilities, strengths or weaknesses.

The scene can go beyond expectation with the introduction to weapons or the participation of someone from the crowd whether it is intentional or unintentional. In the past, only when the opponents died could the other participant be considered as the winner. Similarly, at present, the match is only over when one surrenders, or both are unable to continue, when someone from the crowd or the police or a security guard stops the fight or "steps in" or when one of the combatants dies. Despite the brutal and life-threatening consequences, people’s willingness to commit violence have increased over time, escalating the danger of street fights.

 Causes 
The causes of street fighting are varied. Originally, street fighting was a way of defending oneself. In the stone age, fights were mostly aimed for survival purposes – protected territory, secured resources and protected families. According to Mike Martin, a London lecturer in war studies, “Humans fight to achieve status and belonging. They do so because, in evolutionary terms, these are the surest routes to survival and increased reproduction”.

As humans evolve, new conflicts arise in order to gratify more sophisticated wants. The purposes of street fighting shifted to solve interpersonal conflicts. These conflicts could be stratification, misunderstanding, hate speech or even retaliation. For instance, in areas that are not under policy surveillance and criminally dominated, violence is believed to be the substantiation of superior reputation and pride. In other words, people take part in street fights to obtain dominance because of social status given to the ruler. For another instance, men showed off their value in the sense that opponents’ self-esteem are on the verge of being destroyed from their insults, humiliation and vilification to which violence is the go-to resort. Additionally, some fights are driven by alcohol. Alcohol itself does not directly lead to violence but it acts as a catalyst, allowing cheers from the crowds or provocation from opponents to ignite the fight between fighters. Since the consumption of alcohol negatively impacts the brain function, drunk people fail to assess the situation which often results in overreacting and unpredictable fights.

 Effects 

 Biological 
It is theorized that certain biological features of the Homo lineage have evolved over time as a means to mitigate injury from hand-to-hand combat. Facial robusticity, which includes traits such as jaw adductor muscle strength and brow ridge size, may offer a protective effect against combat. The jaw adductors stretch as a means to absorb energy from the punch in order to reduce the likelihood of jaw dislocation and prevent fracture. The postcanine teeth may have evolved to be larger and thicker so as to allow the energy from the punch to be transferred from the jaw to the skull. Additionally, the proportion of the human hands have evolved in a way that allows for the formation of a fist, something that was not possible in pre-Homo species.

 Physical and mental health 
The consequence of street fighting is undeniably dangerous and critical. Both sides of the fighters are exposed to either short-term or long-term physical health issues. Such poor health includes temporary and permanent disabilities, fractures, partial body parts losses, severe injuries, or death. For instance, faces, other parts of the head and neck and thorax are the most targeted parts in the body, which account for 83%, 4% and 2% of fractures, respectively, amongst all injuries. Aside from physical health, mental illnesses also result from direct engagement in physical assaults, namely, post-traumatic stress symptoms, substance abuse and depression. Extreme feelings of guilt experienced by some perpetrators in the aftermath of a violent event may lead to suicide.

Not only does the involvement in street fights affect the participants, it also collaterally influences the participants’ family members and friends, especially small children. Traumatic expose in small children to such negative experience often leads to post-traumatic stress reactions such as fear, sadness, numbness, timidness, moodiness, eating disorders, difficult sleeping or nightmares. Adults also have the high probability of coping with trauma even though they do not suffer from any direct injuries. Street fight can also lead to negative influence on witnesses and society with an increase in preterm birth, increase in mortality rate and communal trauma. Such exposure to violence can result in cumulative influences on physical condition which customised treatment is required to access all aspects of violent experience.

 Legal 
Street fighting is usually illegal due to its disruption of public order. Depending on each localities’ laws and the gravity of the situation, participants may be liable to either a fine or imprisonment. In South Australia, for example, the maximum penalty for the offence of fighting in public is a $1,250 fine or three months imprisonment. In New South Wales, Australia, persons involved in a fight that could intimidate the public can be charged by the police for the offence of affray with a maximum punishment of ten years imprisonment. If any injuries are caused during the fight, the severity of the injury will impact the penalty of the participants. Intentional injuries, especially, will result in more severe penalties. One may still be liable for the injuries of the victim even if the injuries were not directly caused by that person but by another participating in the fight. If someone dies, all members in the group that are involved in the assault may be accused of murder, no matter who inflicted the fatal blow. Self-defence is generally too narrow to provide protection.

 Economic 
In terms of economics, street fights result in damage to social infrastructure. In 2000, a fund worth approximately 9 million euros was spent in order to repair previous three-year demolition done by street fighters. In 1995 in Basque city, the destruction of public transport resulting from street fights cost 2.5 million euros.

 Underground street fight clubs 

Street fights used to happen in the dark, out of communal sight. With the exposure to social media, however, street fights have become more transparent. Organisers that help with professional street fight setup are known as "clubs", which are run on a money-oriented basis. These clubs can host either amateur underground fights or professional ones. In New York, professional fighters are those who contend for the prize (money or gift) which has monetary value exceeding $75. In contrast, amateur fights also known as 'smokers' refer to unsanctioned fights where no safeguards and regulations are required.

Despite the fact that some illegal fight clubs still run within the authorisers’ competence, some street fight clubs even obtain authoritative approval, meaning these sanctioning entities are running under the supervision of a certified regulator. Some further requirements for professional fights enacted by New York State Athletics Commission (NYSAC) include:

 Medical check-ups for participants before and after the fight
 A minimum attendance of one commission-designated doctor and an ambulance with medical personnel equipped with appropriate resuscitation kits to be on scene
 Medical insurance must be provided to participants
 The venue must meet safety requirements

Pre-fight medical check-ups are required to ensure that the participants are not involved with drugs or infectious diseases such as HIV, Hepatitis or any other illnesses. Any fights that are not in compliance with the authoriser rules and regulations is considered illegal and the participants will have to face legal penalty. The venue of the fight is changed every time for confidential protection and will be announced on the fight day. The promoters are in charge of finding different locations to host these fights where indoor boxing rings, gyms or gym mats with crowd-form barricade are utilised as a disguise so as not to attract the public attention. Amongst incentives that draw people into underground street fights, money oriented and attention seeking are the two most fundamental one. In order to qualify for the fight, attendees have to go through a registration process. The fight is either between two randomly matched applicants whose identity will be kept until the matching day or between two attendees with unresolved conflicts. Sometimes, it can be between 2 fighters urging to start their MMA career that get matched right on the registration spot.  Attendees are required to comply with the rules set by the club. The grant price is usually given to the winner only, but sometimes both people can be paid. The club is funded by entrance tickets sold to audiences with undisclosed amounts. The audience may have to go through a security check for weapons as it is not allowed inside the venue. On several occasions, the audience gamble on the result of the fight, particularly, they place their bet on one of the attendees that they expect to win in the hope of a worthy return. The fight lasts for three rounds, sometimes an additional round is conducted for the reason that the crowd’s provocation fuels the combativeness of the attendees.

 Street fighters 

 Bruce Lee: A martial artist who is well-known for his achievements in Kung Fu. With his respect to the spirit and aesthetics of the original Kung Fu, he criticized the impracticality of academic Kung Fu, stating it was unsuitable for real street fights. Therefore, he brought Kung Fu from practice into actual street fighting, emphasizing the dynamic side of a street fight – alive and unpredictable. Based on his research and analysis, he came up with his own style, Jeet Kune Do, greatly expanding the visibility of Kung Fu to American society.
 Kevin Ferguson: Better known as "Kimbo Slice", he started his career participating in underground street fights. He gained public recognition after footage of him defeating his opponents went viral on the Internet. In his first taped fight against a man named Big D, Ferguson left a large cut on his opponent's right eye which led Internet fans to call him "Slice", becoming the last name to his already popular childhood nickname, Kimbo.
 Tank Abbott: He engaged in many street fights before beginning his professional career with UFC.
 Chuck Wepner: A retired professional boxer. He was once a street fighter and took part in multiple street fights from a young age.

 Bar fights 

A bar fight, sometimes known as a pub brawl'', is a type of street fight that happens in bars, pubs, and taverns. It is commonly depicted in fiction, most notably in Hollywood films and crime video games.

See also 
 Mutual combat
 Gouging (fighting style)
 Jailhouse rock (fighting style)
 Tawuran, mass street fighting between gangs of students in Indonesia
 Streetbeefs

References 

Combat
Martial arts terminology
Riots
Fighting
Violence